This is a list of parks in Fort Wayne, Indiana. As of 2009, the Fort Wayne Parks and Recreation Department maintained 86 public parks, including three golf courses, totaling . The department also cares for 45,100 street trees and 15,000 park trees. The Foellinger-Freimann Botanical Conservatory gardens cover , displaying over 1,200 plants of 502 different species and 72 types of cactus.

The private parks listing only includes parks within the municipal boundaries of the City of Fort Wayne and excludes county parks or nature preserves. Those parks are privately owned or operated, though they may be accessible to the general public.

Public parks

Private parks
Camp Thomas A. Scott Wetlands Nature Preserve
Crystal Spring Park
Dupont Sport and Fitness Park
Fort Wayne Police Memorial Garden
Indian Trails Park
Klotz Park
Library Plaza
Lutheran Park and Gardens
Mengerson Nature Reserve
Northwood Park
I&M Power Center Plaza
Parkview Family Park
Praise Park
Van Hoozen Community Park
Westlawn Park

See also
Fort Wayne Daisies

References

External links
Fort Wayne Parks and Recreation

Geography of Fort Wayne, Indiana
Protected areas of Allen County, Indiana
Fort Wayne